At the Edge of the City is a 1953 Italian crime film drama directed by Carlo Lizzani. The film stars Massimo Girotti, Marina Berti and Giulietta Masina. In Rome a young man is falsely accused of killing his girlfriend. It was shot at the Palatino Studios in Rome and on location in the city. The film used neorealist style and was based on a real-life case.

Plot 
Mario Ilari, a young unemployed worker, is unjustly accused of killing a girl he knows of him. Once arrested, he manages to escape and hide in the house of his partner Gina, but ends up in prison again. The lawyer Roberto Marini agrees to take his defense after being contacted by Luisa, a friend of Gina, convinced that the trial will give him the opportunity to assert himself.  The situation, however, is complicated by the fact that Calì, a homeless man, says he saw Ilari at the scene of the crime. Ilari confesses that he met Greta through a female friend, who should have facilitated his expatriation. When the lawyer Marini accuses Calì of perjury, he kills himself. The situation is resolved when the body of Greta is found, killed by the real culprit after being kidnapped. Ilari is freed and Marini and Luisa confess their mutual love.

Cast 
 Massimo Girotti as Avv. Roberto Martini
 Marina Berti as Luisa
 Giulietta Masina as  Gina Ilari
 Michel Jourdan as Mario Ilari
 Lucien Gallas as P.C.
 Rossana Martini as  Elena
 Adriana Sivieri as  Greta
 Patrizia Lari as  Betty
 Paola Borboni as  Madre di Luisa
 Giulio Calì as  Calì
 Amilcare Fabrizio as Fabrizio
 Antonio Nicotra
 Benedetta Rutili
 Cesare Fantoni
 Carlo d'Elia
 Giuliano Montaldo
 Andrea Petricca
 Franco Caruso
 Bruno Berellini
 Maria Laura Rocca

References

Bibliography 
 Moliterno, Gino. The A to Z of Italian Cinema. Scarecrow Press, 2009.

External links 
 

1953 films
Italian crime drama films
1950s Italian-language films
Films set in Rome
Italian black-and-white films
1953 crime drama films
Films directed by Carlo Lizzani
Films directed by Massimo Mida
1950s Italian films
Films shot at Palatino Studios